Oligophlebia eusphyra is a moth of the family Sesiidae. It is only known from Kuranda in Queensland near Cairns.

The length of the forewings is about 6 mm for males and 8–9 for females.

Nothing is known of the biology of Pennisetia eusphyra, but considering the similarities with Oligophlebia igniflua, it seems likely that the species will ultimately be found on one or more of the numerous species of Elaeocarpus found throughout the rainforest areas from northern New South Wales north along the coast of Queensland.

External links
Australian Faunal Directory
Classification of the Superfamily Sesioidea (Lepidoptera: Ditrysia)

Moths of Australia
Sesiidae
Moths described in 1917